Bhitarno Shankhanaad is a collection of Gujarati ghazals by Bhavesh Bhatt. It is published by Rannade Prakashan, Ahmedabad in January 2014. It is preceded by Chhe To Chhe. The preface of the book has written by Rajesh Vyas 'Miskin', Ankit Trivedi and Dr. Sharad Thaker.

Content 
The book is consist of 112 ghazals. Most of the ghazals of the book have composed in an Arabic metres such as Ramal, Mutkarib, Mutdarik, Majharia and Khafif.

Reception 
Poet Bhavesh Bhatt was awarded the Shayda Award of 2014 for his works Chhe To Chhe (2008) and Bhitar No Shankhanaad. Some ghazals of this collection such as "Achanak Vahen Ma Badlaav Aave", "Aarti Utaarvani Emane Aadat Hati" And "Ek Pandadu Khare To Amne Farak Pade Chhe" are very popular in mushairas.

References

Gujarati-language poetry collections
2014 poems
Indian poetry collections
2014 in India
21st-century Indian books